Káld is a village in Vas county, Hungary.
It's 16 km far from Sárvár and 35 km far from Sümeg.

References

Populated places in Vas County